Vikram Vedha is the soundtrack album of the 2017 Indian neo-noir action thriller film of the same name, directed by Pushkar-Gayathri, and produced by S. Sashikanth under the banner YNOT Studios, starring Madhavan, Vijay Sethupathi, Shraddha Srinath, Kathir and Varalaxmi Sarathkumar. The soundtrack album and the background score is composed by Sam C. S. with lyrics written by Mohan Rajan, Muthamil, Vignesh Shivan and the composer respectively. Sam had previously worked with Pushkar and Gayathri on television commercials, before they decided to recruit him, after his work on Puriyatha Puthir, which was his debut film.

The soundtrack album features 10 songs, with six instrumental compositions.  The team released two singles "Tasakku Tasakku" on 5 June 2017 and "Yaanji" on 12 June 2017, before the entire album unveiled on 19 June 2017. The soundtrack received generally positive reception from critics.

Development 
Sam composed the score based on the script instead of doing it after watching the film's final version. He used the same approach for Puriyatha Puthir. He believed this would give him more creative freedom while also helping the actors and directors understand how to depict the emotions the characters portray in a particular sequence. In an interview with Kaushik LM of The Hindu, Sam said he "used ethnic Indian instruments, and live orchestra" to compose the score. He completed 80 percent of the score before the commencement of principal photography, leading Pushkar and Gayathri to shoot the scenes according to the music he composed. After shooting for the film ended, Sam fine-tuned the score to achieve better results.

Pushkar and Gayathri had initially opted against including songs in the film, but then thought lyrics might work better than music alone and changed their decision. Sam employed the vocal percussion technique of beatboxing for the track "Tasakku Tasakku" as he felt it would be better to use "real sounds" to depict the atmosphere in a bar. At Sethupathi's insistence, Vignesh Shivan was hired to write the lyrics for "Karuppu Vellai".

Release 
The audio rights of the soundtrack album were acquired by Think Music. The team released the first single "Tasakku Tasakku" on 5 June 2017, rendered by Mukesh, M. L. R. Karthikeyan, Sam C. S. and Guna. Followed by the second single track, "Yaanji" on 12 June 2017, which is a melodius composition rendered by Anirudh Ravichander and Shakthisree Gopalan, with lyrics written by Mohan Rajan. The entire soundtrack album was unveiled through all streaming platforms on 19 June 2017.

Track listing

Reception 
Sharanya CR from The Times of India noted in her review that Sam "brings out the essence of the film’s plot" with "Karuppu Vellai", and used the term "stylish, yet flawless" to describe Anirudh's and Shakthisree Gopalan's rendition of "Yaanji". She felt "Pogatha Yennavittu" was "an impressive composition" and appreciated the "very peppy" beats in "Tasakku Tasakku", adding that it "can be reserved for parties". Sharanya concluded her review by stating that "the composer hits the high-note" with Vikram Vedha, writing further that "the film's narrative is sure to up the experience through music" with the instrumental tracks.

Behindwoods rated the album 2.75 out of 5, with a verdict "An innovative, genre specific album that has the depth and soul from composer Sam CS!" Top 10 Cinema, gave a favourable review stating that "Expressing a different and new dimension with more theme scores." Musicaloud rated the album 3.5 out of 5.

References 

2017 soundtrack albums
Tamil film soundtracks